The 2015 season was the 106th season in the history of Sport Club Corinthians Paulista.

Background

Kit
 Home (September 2015 onward): White shirt, black shorts and white socks;
 Away (November 2015 onward): Black shirt, white shorts and black socks;
 Third (September 2015 onward): Orange shirt, orange shorts and orange socks.

Previous kits
 Home (Until September 2015): White shirt, black shorts and white socks.
 Away (Until November 2015): Black shirt, white shorts and black socks;

Squad
As of 15 September 2015

 (on loan from Bragantino)

 (on loan from Criciúma)
 (on loan from Ponte Preta)

Transfers

Transfers in

Loans in

Transfers out

Loans out

Squad statistics

Overview

Pre-season and friendlies

Last updated: 22 July 2015Source:

Campeonato Paulista

For the 2015 Campeonato Paulista, the 20 teams are divided in four groups of 5 teams (A, B, C, D). They will face all teams, except those that are in their own group, with the top two teams from each group qualifying for the quarter-finals, where they will face each other. The top teams from each group will host the match. The best campaign also guarantees the home advantage for the semi-final as well as hosting the second leg of the finals.

Statistics

First stage

Knockout stages

Libertadores

First stage

Corinthians advanced to second stage (Group 2).

Second stage

Knockout stages

Guaraní advanced to the quarterfinals.

Campeonato Brasileiro

Results

Copa do Brasil

Due to being qualified to the 2015 Copa Libertadores, Corinthians entered the competition on the Round of 16.

Knockout stages

Santos advanced to the quarterfinals.

See also
List of Sport Club Corinthians Paulista seasons

Notes

References

Sport Club Corinthians Paulista seasons
Corinthians